Gangotri is a town and pilgrimage centre in Uttarakhand, India.

Gangotri may also refer to:

 Gangotri Bhandari (born 1956), former player of Indian women's hockey team
 Gangotri Kujur, Indian politician
 Gangotri Glacier, the source of Bhagirathi River
 Gangotri (cow), a temple cow in Britain killed by the RSPCA
 Gangotri (film), 2003 Telugu film directed by K. Raghavendra Rao
 Gangothri (film), a 1997 Indian Malayalam film
 Gangotri National Park, national park located in Uttarkashi District, Uttarakhand, India
 Gangotri Group of mountains with peaks up to around 6,600 m AMSL, a subdivision of the Garhwal Himalaya in Uttarakhand, India, enclosing Gangotri Glacier
 Dakshin Gangotri, Indian scientific base station in Antarctica
 Dakshin Gangotri Glacier, Antarctic Specially Protected Area in the Schirmacher Oasis